Liz Callaway (born April 13, 1961) is an American actress, singer and recording artist, who is best known for having provided the singing voices of many female characters in animated films, such as Anya/Anastasia in Anastasia, Odette in The Swan Princess, Jasmine in the Aladdin sequels The Return of Jafar and Aladdin and the King of Thieves, adult Kiara in The Lion King II: Simba's Pride, and a dancing napkin ring in Beauty and the Beast. She was also the original Ellen in the Broadway production of Miss Saigon.

Early life, family, and education 

Callaway was born in Chicago, Illinois to Shirley Callaway, a singer, pianist, and vocal coach, and John Callaway, a journalist. Her sister is actress, composer, and singer Ann Hampton Callaway, with whom she sang the theme song for the Fran Drescher comedy series The Nanny, which Hampton Callaway also composed. Both sisters attended New Trier High School (New Trier East) in Winnetka, Illinois. Callaway has also appeared in a number of cabaret and stage productions with her sister. Recordings of two of them, Sibling Revelry recorded live at Rainbow and Stars in 1995 and Boom! recorded live at Birdland in 2011, have been released.

Career 
Liz Callaway made her Broadway debut in Stephen Sondheim's short-lived Merrily We Roll Along (1981). This began a long-term professional relationship with Sondheim: Callaway has performed in a number of live concerts in his honor, appeared with Sondheim on Inside the Actors Studio, and also played the role of Young Sally in the Lincoln Center concert production of Follies with Mandy Patinkin, Barbara Cook, George Hearn, Lee Remick, Carol Burnett, Elaine Stritch, and the New York Philharmonic. Follies was recorded live and also filmed as a documentary.

Additional stage credits include Lizzie in Baby (for which she earned a Tony Award nomination), The Three Musketeers, The Spitfire Grill (for which she earned a Drama Desk Award nomination), Sunday in the Park with George, Evita, Cats, and Miss Saigon. Liz also performed in  The Look of Love, a 2003 musical revue of the songs of Burt Bacharach and Hal David.  Callaway also had her own children's television show on WNEV-TV in Boston, Ready to Go, which ran from 1987 to 1991, winning her an Emmy Award. She left this series  to begin rehearsals for Miss Saigon on Broadway.

In July 2012, she starred as Norma Desmond in the Pittsburgh CLO's new production of Sunset Boulevard

Callaway has also provided the singing voices for a number of animated characters, including Anya/Anastasia in Anastasia, Kiara in The Lion King II: Simba's Pride, Princess Jasmine in The Return of Jafar and Aladdin and the King of Thieves, and Princess Odette in The Swan Princess.

She has performed various cabaret acts at Joe's Pub, Rainbow and Stars, the Russian Tea Room, 54 Below, and Lincoln Center in New York City, and at the Donmar Warehouse in London, among other venues.

Callaway's solo recordings include Anywhere I Wander (1993), The Story Goes On (1995), and The Beat Goes On (2001).  She released her fourth recording, Passage of Time, for the record label PS Classics, on October 20, 2009, which featured an appearance with her sister Ann Hampton Callaway. In 2015 she released an album of songs from her most recognized work, The Essential Liz Callaway.

Liz was honored at the 25th Annual Bistro Awards in New York City.

Personal life 
Liz married theatre director and producer Dan Foster in 1985, a founding producer of the Hudson Stage Company, a nonprofit, professional theatre company in residence at Pace University in Westchester County, New York. They have a son.

Filmography

Film

Television

Discography 
 Anywhere I Wander (Varèse Sarabande) (September 28, 1993)
 Sibling Revelry (DRG, 1996) with Ann Hampton Callaway
 The Story Goes On (Varèse Sarabande) (August 29, 1995)
 The Beat Goes On (Varèse Sarabande) (May 15, 2001)
 Passage of Time (PS Classics) (October 20, 2009)
 Boom! Live at Birdland (PS Classics, 2011) with Ann Hampton Callaway
 Merry and Bright (2013)
 Comfort and Joy (An Acoustic Christmas) (Working Girl Records) (December 4, 2020)

References

External links 
 Official website
 
 

American stage actresses
American women singers
American musical theatre actresses
American sopranos
American voice actresses
New Trier High School alumni
Actresses from Chicago
1961 births
Living people
21st-century American women